The 2001 Sparkassen Cup on Ice was the third event of six in the 2001–02 ISU Grand Prix of Figure Skating, a senior-level international invitational competition series. It was held at the Emscher-Lippe-Halle in Gelsenkirchen on November 9–11. Medals were awarded in the disciplines of men's singles, ladies' singles, pair skating, and ice dancing. Skaters earned points toward qualifying for the 2001–02 Grand Prix Final.

Results

Men

Ladies

Pairs

Ice dancing

External links
 2001 Sparkassen Cup on Ice
 https://web.archive.org/web/20120324011345/http://ww2.isu.org/news/gpspark1.html
 https://web.archive.org/web/20120324011349/http://ww2.isu.org/news/gpspark2.html
 https://web.archive.org/web/20120324011352/http://ww2.isu.org/news/gpspark3.html

Sparkassen Cup, 2001
Bofrost Cup on Ice